North Darley (meaning rock slab river) is a hamlet in Cornwall, England. It is two miles south of North Hill on the B3254 road from Launceston to Liskeard.

References

Hamlets in Cornwall